Ionel Haiduc (born 9 May 1937 in Cluj) is a Romanian chemist who was elected to the Romanian Academy and Academy of Sciences of Moldova. He was the President of the Romanian Academy between 2006 and 2014.

Honours

National honours
  Romanian Royal Family: Honorary Knight Commander of the Order of the Crown
  Romanian Royal Family: Knight of the Royal Decoration of the Cross of the Romanian Royal House
  Romanian Republic: Grand Cross of the Order of the Star of Romania

Foreign honours
 : Grand Cross of the Order of Honour

External links
Profile, ubbcluj.ro; accessed 8 March 2016.

References

1937 births
Living people
Scientists from Cluj-Napoca
Romanian chemists
Rectors of Babeș-Bolyai University
Presidents of the Romanian Academy
Honorary members of the Academy of Sciences of Moldova
Recipients of the Order of the Crown (Romania)
Commanders of the Order of the Crown (Romania)
Grand Crosses of the Order of the Star of Romania
Recipients of the Order of Honour (Moldova)